Zeyad Abdulrazak Al-Khudhur Al-Enazy (born 18 July 1969) is a Kuwaiti hurdler. He competed in the 110 metres hurdles at the 1988 Summer Olympics and the 1992 Summer Olympics.

References

External links
 

1969 births
Living people
Athletes (track and field) at the 1988 Summer Olympics
Athletes (track and field) at the 1992 Summer Olympics
Kuwaiti male hurdlers
Olympic athletes of Kuwait
Place of birth missing (living people)